General Sir Charles Frederic Keightley,  (24 June 1901 – 17 June 1974) was a senior British Army officer who served during and following the Second World War. After serving with distinction during the Second World War – becoming, in 1944, the youngest corps commander in the British Army – he had a distinguished postwar career and was the Governor of Gibraltar from 1958 to 1962.

Since Keightley‘s death, there has been much scrutiny of the methods he employed in 1945 to send thousands of Cossacks and White Russians to their death at the hands of Stalin.

Early life and military career
Keightley was born on 24 June 1901 at Anerley near Croydon, the only surviving son of Rev. Charles Albert Keightley, the local vicar, and his wife, Kathleen Ross. His early education was at Marlborough College.

He graduated from the Royal Military College, Sandhurst, was commissioned as a second lieutenant in December 1921 into the 5th Dragoon Guards (Princess Charlotte of Wales's) which through amalgamation with the 6th (Inniskilling) Dragoons became the 5th/6th Dragoons the following year. He was promoted lieutenant at the end of 1923 and captain in April 1932, having served three years as the regiment's adjutant. He attended the Staff College, Camberley from 1935 to 1936, and after a staff posting was in October 1937 appointed a brigade major of a mechanised cavalry brigade in Egypt. He was able, however, in November to take part in the coronation of King George VI in London as a member of the procession accompanying the King and Queen. In September 1938 his brigade became part of the new Mobile Division in Egypt commanded by the influential Percy Hobart.

Keightley was able to benefit from Hobart's tutelage for only a brief period and having been promoted to the rank of major he was appointed in December 1938 an instructor at the Staff College, Camberley with a local rank of lieutenant-colonel.

Second World War
In 1940, during the Second World War, he was appointed as Assistant Adjutant & Quartermaster General (chief administrative officer) of the 1st Armoured Division, then commanded by Major-General Roger Evans, during that division's deployment to France. After the evacuation from France the division reformed back in England. On 13 May 1941, Keightley, on promotion to the acting rank of brigadier, was given command of the 30th Armoured Brigade, part of the 11th Armoured Division, which by this time was commanded by Major-General Percy Hobart. He was appointed an Officer of the Order of the British Empire in July 1941.

In late December 1941 he was promoted to acting major-general to become Commandant of the Royal Armoured Corps Training Establishment. After only five months in this job he was briefly given command on 21 April 1942 of the 11th Armoured Division, which was then based in the United Kingdom and then on 19 May 1942 went to command the 6th Armoured Division and led it with distinction throughout the Tunisian Campaign, elements landing in French North Africa in November as part of Operation Torch. He was made a Companion of the Order of the Bath for his services in Tunisia and also was awarded the Legion of Merit by the United States government. His permanent rank was advanced from major to lieutenant colonel in September 1943 and again to colonel in April 1944.

In December 1943 he exchanged commands with Major-General Vyvyan Evelegh, the General Officer Commanding (GOC) of the 78th Infantry Division, which had fought alongside the 6th Armoured in Tunisia was then serving in Italy, and which became his first infantry command. He was awarded the Distinguished Service Order in August 1944 and his success as a commander of both armoured and infantry divisions led to his promotion in August 1944 to acting lieutenant-general when he was given command of the British Eighth Army's V Corps, succeeding Lieutenant General Charles Allfrey, in Italy. At the age of 43 he was the youngest officer in the British Army during the Second World War to command a corps in action. Toby Low, the youngest brigadier in the British Army, was Keightley's Brigadier General Staff (BGS). He commanded this corps during Operation Olive, the offensive on the Gothic Line in the autumn of 1944, and also during the final spring offensive in April 1945, when it took a lead role in forcing the Argenta Gap. The corps moved into Austria with the surrender of the German Forces and forces that were fighting on the German side. On 8 May 1945, he signed a demarcation agreement with the Bulgarian First Army commander, General Vladimir Stoychev in Klagenfurt.

In East Tyrol and Carinthia, Keightley's army received the surrender of the "Lienz Cossacks" under their leaders Peter Krasnov, Kelech Ghirey, and Andrei Shkuro and the XVth SS Cossack Cavalry Corps under Helmuth von Pannwitz. At the Yalta Conference, the British committed themselves to return Soviet citizens to the Soviet Union. After consultation with Harold Macmillan Keightley proceeded to hand over these prisoners and their families regardless of their nationality, including people with French, German, Yugoslav or Nansen passports. The prisoners were delivered by deceit and force to SMERSH at Judenburg; many were executed immediately, the remainder sent to the Gulag.

According to Nikolai Tolstoy’s Stalin’s Vengeance (2021) 

In mid-1945, Keightley was appointed Knight Commander of the Order of the British Empire and nominated to lead a proposed "Commonwealth Corps" during Operation Coronet, the second stage of Operation Downfall the plan for the invasion of Japan. The corps was to have been made up of infantry divisions from the Australian, British and Canadian armies. The Australian government objected to the appointment of an officer with no experience fighting the Japanese and the war ended before the details of the corps were finalised.

Post-war

In 1946, Keightley left Austria and reverted to his permanent rank of major-general (to which he had received promotion in February 1945), to become Director of Military Training at the War Office. In 1948, he became the Military Secretary to Manny Shinwell, then the Secretary of State for War, gaining the permanent rank of lieutenant-general. On 21 September 1949, he became Commander-in-Chief (C-in-C) of the British Army of the Rhine (BAOR) in Germany relinquishing the role in April 1951. He was appointed a Knight Commander of the Order of the Bath during his time in the post.

In May 1951, he became the C-in-C Far East Land Forces in the rank of general. In September 1953, he was appointed C-in-C Middle East Land Forces. Also in 1953 Keightley received the honorary appointment of Aide-de-Camp General to the Queen for a three-year tenure. His tenure at Middle East Land Forces included the period of the Suez Crisis and Keightley was C-in-C of Operation Musketeer in 1956. For his services during the period October to December 1956 he was advanced to Knight Grand Cross of the Order of the British Empire and also received the Legion of Honour (Grand Officer) from the French government. In January 1957 he relinquished his Middle East Command and retired from the army that August.

From 23 November 1947 to 23 November 1957, he held the honorary post of Colonel of the 5th Royal Inniskilling Dragoon Guards. He also held the honorary post of Colonel Commandant, Royal Armoured Corps, Cavalry Wing until April 1968.

In retirement Keightley was appointed Governor and Commander-in-Chief of Gibraltar, a post he held from May 1958 until October 1962 when he retired from the army a second time since his role as Commander-in-Chief, although not paid for out of the army's budget, had technically returned him to active duty. From 1958 he served a term as Honorary Colonel of the Royal Gibraltar Regiment.

From 1963 he was appointed Member of the Royal Patriotic Fund Corporation.

He died in Salisbury, Wiltshire, at Salisbury General Infirmary on 17 June 1974, a week before his seventy-third birthday.

Family
Keightley was married to Joan Lydia Smyth-Osbourne of Iddlesleigh in Devon in 1932. They had two sons, of which Richard was also a senior army officer, becoming Commandant of Sandhurst.

Recognition
Keightley Way, a road and tunnel in Gibraltar was named in his honour.

References

Publications
 published in

Bibliography

External links
British Army Officers 1939–1945
Generals of World War II

|-

|-

|-

|-

|-

|-

|-

|-

1901 births
1974 deaths
British Army generals of World War II
British military personnel of the Cyprus Emergency
British military personnel of the Suez Crisis
Companions of the Distinguished Service Order
Deputy Lieutenants of Dorset
Knights Grand Cross of the Order of the Bath
Knights Grand Cross of the Order of the British Empire
Commanders of the Legion of Merit
Governors of Gibraltar
5th Royal Inniskilling Dragoon Guards officers
Graduates of the Staff College, Camberley
Graduates of the Royal Military College, Sandhurst
Officers of the Legion of Merit
People educated at Marlborough College
5th Dragoon Guards officers
People from Croydon
Academics of the Staff College, Camberley
Military personnel from London